Palpada agrorum, the Double-banded Plushback, is a common species of syrphid fly first officially described by Fabricius in 1787. Hoverflies get their names from the ability to remain nearly motionless while in flight. The adults are also known as flower flies for they are commonly found around and on flowers, from which they get both energy-giving nectar and protein-rich pollen. The larvae are aquatic filter feeders of the rat-tailed type.

Distribution
external map
This species is found in North and South America with the most common occurrences in the South East United States.

Description
For terms see Morphology of Diptera.

external images

Head
The face is concealed beneath white pollen and thick pure white pile that is more abundant on the frontal triangle. The facial stripe and cheeks are shining black. The eyes are pilose and Holoptic in male. Antennae  are obscurely reddish or ferruginous with a bare arista.
Thorax
The scutum is black, clothed with yellowish-white pile in front, intermixed with blackish pile behind.  In front of the suture is a conspicuous grayish pollinose broad band, and on each side with an oblique spot reaching from the root of the wing backward toward the scutellum. The scutellum  is yellow, with a narrowly black base, and black pile  female. Differs in the presence of a complete grayish band on the dorsum of the thorax in front of the scutellum  The meron has fine pale hairs in front of or below spiracle.
Abdomen
First segment of abdomen black with the outer angles yellow. The second segment is light yellow, with a narrow median opaque black stripe not quite reaching the hind margin, and a little broader in front. The third segment  is black with an  anterior oval reddish yellow spot on each side, confluent with the yellow of the preceding segment, the hind border  is yellow. The fourth segment is black with a yellow hind border, and a narrow interrupted shining fascia dilated on the sides; The hypopygium is shining black with light pile; pile on the opaque portions black, on the yellow spots yellow.  In the female the second segment of the abdomen is broadly opaque black in the middle, narrower in front and extending as a fascia to the lateral margin of the abdomen behind; the third and fourth segments have each, also, a narrow, interrupted shining fascia, and the lower part of the front is not wholly white pilose.
Wing  
The wings  are hyaline, sometimes faintly clouded in the middle and outer parts. Near the end of the marginal cell there is a distinct curvature of the second vein (R2+3) into the submarginal cell. Cell r2+3 closed before wing margin.
Legs
The legs are mostly black. The knees, basal third of front and hind tibia, basal half of the intermediate tibiae, and the middle metatarsi are light yellow. The extreme base of the anterior metatarsi are luteous. The hind femora are dilated.

References

External links

 

Eristalinae
Articles created by Qbugbot
Insects described in 1787
Taxa named by Johan Christian Fabricius
Hoverflies of North America